The Pelibüey or  is a Cuban breed of domestic sheep. It is found principally in Cuba, where it is the most numerous breed of sheep, but is also reared elsewhere in the Caribbean and in some coastal parts of Mexico. It is a hair sheep – its coat is of hair, not wool; this is a common adaptation to tropical environments. It is likely that it derives at least in part from African breeds of sheep such as the West African Dwarf, and probable that it is related to other American breeds of African origin such as the Barbados Black Belly, the Roja Africana of Venezuela and the Oveja Africana of Colombia.

It is raised primarily for meat.

References

Sheep breeds